The women's 200 metre breaststroke competition of the swimming events at the 2012 European Aquatics Championships took place May 24 and 25. The heats and semifinals took place on May 24, the final on May 25.

Records
Prior to the competition, the existing world, European and championship records were as follows.

Results

Heats
36 swimmers participated in 5 heats.

Semifinals
The eight fastest swimmers advanced to the final.

Semifinal 1

Semifinal 2

Final
The final was held at 17:38.

References

Women's 200 m breaststroke